Wah Yan College may refer to:

 Wah Yan College, Hong Kong, in Wan Chai, Hong Kong Island
 Wah Yan College, Kowloon, in Yau Ma Tei, Kowloon